The Provincial Treasury is one of the departments of the Government of the Northern Cape. The Provincial Treasury manages the provincial economic policy, prepares the provincial government's annual budget and manages the provincial government's finances.

The political head of the department is Abraham Vosloo, the MEC for Finance, Economic Development and Tourism. He manages the Provincial Treasury, as well as the Provincial Department of Economic Development and Tourism.

References

External links
Official website

Government of the Northern Cape
Ministries established in 1994